This is a list of all personnel changes for the 2019 EuroLeague off-season and 2019–20 EuroLeague season.

Retirements
The following players who played in the 2018–19 Euroleague, and played more than three EuroLeague seasons, retired.

Managerial changes

Player movements

Between two EuroLeague teams

To a EuroLeague team

Leaving a EuroLeague team

References

Transactions
EuroLeague transactions